Crider may refer to:

Places 
Crider, Kentucky
Crider, Missouri
Crider Creek, a stream in Osage and Gasconade counties of central Missouri
Criders, Virginia,  Criders is an unincorporated community located in Rockingham County, in the U.S. state of Virginia. It is located in George Washington National Forest, west of Bergton near the state border with West Virginia

People 
Bill Crider (1941–2018), American author
Cori Crider, attorney and activist
Curtis Crider (1930–2012), American stock car racing drive
Frank Crider (1907–1962), American football player and coach
Harry Crider (born 1999), American football player
Jerry Crider (1941–2008), baseball pitcher
John Crider (born 1933), politician and lawyer
Michael Crider, Republican member of the Indiana Senate
Michèle Crider (born 1959), operatic soprano
Norman Crider (1938–2009), baton-twirling champion and shop proprietor

Other uses 
Honda Crider, an automobile
Crider (soil), the state soil of Kentucky